Midnight Club 3: Dub Edition is a racing video game developed by Rockstar San Diego and published by Rockstar Games. It is the third installment in the Midnight Club series. Like previous installments in the series, the game is an arcade-style racer and focuses on wild, high-speed racing, rather than realistic physics and driving. The name is derived from a partnership between Rockstar and DUB Magazine, which features heavily in the game in the form of DUB-sponsored races and DUB-customized vehicles as prizes.

Players race through open world recreations of San Diego, Atlanta, and Detroit listening to 98 (124 in the Remix version) licensed music tracks that include hip hop, rock, and other genres. The game features a number of graphical views after the player crashes into certain objects, or travels across particular stretches of road. There is also the ability to customize a player's vehicle. Other than modifying the external looks, the vehicle's performance can also be improved (with the exception of all "A" Class vehicles except motorcycles). Midnight Club 3: Dub Edition is the first game in the series to feature licensed vehicles.

Gameplay

Midnight Club 3: Dub Edition is an open world racing video game and the first game in the series to include car modification, both visual and performance. By winning races, the player unlocks new cars and options to customize them with. These options include enhancing the performance, adding vinyls and new paint jobs, and physically modifying the car by changing parts such as wheels, bumpers, spoilers, neon, hoods, and engine components. The cars are divided into four classes: D, C, B and A, depending on their performance.

There are five types of races in the game: Ordered Race, Circuit Race, Unordered Race, Autocross Race, Track and Frenzy. In ordered races the player races through the city on a course marked by yellow-orange flares to reach a finish line. In circuit races the player races along a circuit course through the city for a set number of laps. In unordered races the player is free to go through scattered checkpoints in any order before crossing the finish line. Autocross races take place in a walled-in circuit of the street with no traffic or police, the goal being to finish the circuit faster than a set time. Track events, available in arcade mode, are similar to autocross races, except that the player competes against other races inside the barricaded track, often taking more damage. Frenzy events also available in Arcade, are time trial races where the player gets every 15 second a nitrous boost, also the handbrake won't work and the race only ends when the time is over.

Players can also create their own races in the Race Editor (not available in the PSP version). Players can create either a circuit, ordered or unordered race by placing checkpoints throughout the city, and can change racing conditions such as traffic, weather, and time of day.

Vehicles

There are seven types of cars: Tuners, Luxury Sedans, SUVs/Trucks, Exotics, Muscle Cars, Sport Bikes, and Choppers. As the game continues, different clubs that drive a specific type of car will invite the player to race with them: American Royalty Car Club (Muscle Cars), Big Playas (SUV s/Trucks), By Invitation Only (Exotics), Chopper of America Bike Club (Choppers), Luxury Rollers (Luxury Cars), Original Riders (Sport Bikes) and Unbeatable Street Racers (Tuners). If the player beats a club in three races they unlock a special ability for that class. Tuners, Sport Bikes, Exotics, the Lexus SC430, Mercedes Benz SL 500 and the Cadillac XLR in "Remix" get "Zone" (a form of bullet time which allows for more precise handling at high speeds), Trucks/SUVs and Luxury Cars get "Agro" (which allows the vehicle to plow through traffic and other obstacles without taking damage or slowing down), and Muscle Cars and Choppers get "Roar" (the only offensive ability, it launches a sonic wave that blows away any vehicles in its path).

Multiplayer
The game includes an online mode, where players can race with other players from all around the world. There are also many clubs available to join, but players can also start and manage their own. Most offline modes are available for play online, while in online mode it's possible to chat in-game, including a cruise mode, capture the flag, circuit racing, ordered racing, unordered racing, tag, paint and Autocross. Tracks created via the Race Editor offline can be used Online.

Plot

San Diego
The player begins in San Diego by meeting Oscar, the mechanic of Six-One-Nine Customs, a tuning garage in San Diego. Oscar guides the player through the game by providing helpful tips and information about races. The player begins with a choice of six cars: a 1964 Chevrolet Impala, a 1978 Chevrolet Monte Carlo, a 2004 Dodge Neon SRT-4, a 2004 Mitsubishi Eclipse, a Volkswagen Golf R32, or a 2004 Volkswagen Jetta (Midnight Club 3: Dub Edition Remix added the option of a Scion tC). As the player wins races new customization options and cars are unlocked for purchase. and a Chrysler 300 DUB Edition

The street racers available to challenge at the beginning of the game are: Vanessa (Mitsubishi Eclipse), Bishop (Lexus GS430), and Carlos (1978 Chevrolet Monte Carlo). Beating each of these street racers will unlock an invitation to challenge a racing club the rival racer is part of; Vanessa unlocks the Unbeatable Street Racers (Tuners), Bishop unlocks the Luxury Rollers (Luxury Sedans) and Carlos unlocks the American Royalty Car Club (Muscle Cars) Beating two of these street racers will allow the player to challenge Phil for ownership of his Hotmatch Cuevito, and an invitation to challenge the Chopper of America bike club. Once the player defeats Phil, Vanessa will challenge them again.

After defeating all racers and tournaments in San Diego, the player is introduced to Vince, a mechanic from Detroit. Oscar mentions that the player has been building a reputation as a skilled racer, and that there are some big time races in Atlanta that the player may be interested in. He tells the player to go to the shipping company to make the trip.

Atlanta
The player arrives in a rather nice looking garage in Atlanta called "Apone Team Racing". The owner, Apone, introduces himself, but is distracted by his most prized possession: a 1964 gold painted Chevrolet Impala that he customized and is constantly tinkering with. In Atlanta, the player is challenged by three racers. There is also a tournament going on, for which the prize is a "DUB'd-Out" 2004 Cadillac Escalade EXT. After defeating all racers and tournaments in Atlanta, Apone mentions that there are more races going on in Detroit and that he thinks it's a good idea for the player to check it out.

Street racers in Atlanta are: Roy (1969 Dodge Charger R/T, later a 1999 Dodge Charger R/T Concept), Dre (2005 Cadillac Escalade), Cheng (Mitsubishi Lancer Evolution VIII), Vito (Ducati Monster S4R), Lamont (Chevrolet Silverado SS) and Naomi (Hotmatch Skully). Defeating Vito unlocks the Original Riders (Sport Bikes), defeating Dre unlocks the Big Playas (SUV/Trucks).

Detroit
The player arrives in Detroit and sees a familiar face, Vince. Remembering him, he welcomes the player to town and his shop. He later points to a Lamborghini Murciélago and says it's the prize to whatever car club turns out the best street racer. Some returning faces from Atlanta come to Detroit, including Roy and Angel, who are plot-affected racers but they are never seen or mentioned. The player races them a couple of times, as well as the car clubs. Early in the player's Detroit career, a tournament is held and a 1949 Chevrolet Fleetline (as Oscar describes it "Just the car to win in Detroit!") is the prize. Upon defeating the racers, the player scores a challenge from the By Invitation Only Exotic Car Club. Defeating them unlocks "Zone" for Exotics and a special, rare 2004 Chrysler ME Four-Twelve. At this point, the player races all drivers twice, and upon defeating them, is crowned the victor of the U.S. Champion Series. Afterwards, the player returns to Vince's and is rewarded the Lamborghini Murcielago from before. Vince says: "It should be driven with respect, and not by some San Diego swinger who thinks he's hot stuff or something".

Street racers in Detroit are: Roy (returning with a Dodge Viper GTS-R), Spider (Hotmatch D'Elegance), Leo (1981 Camaro Z28), Caesar (Mercedes-Benz SLR McLaren, later a Lamborghini Gallardo), Kioshi (Aprilla Mille Factory), and Angel (Saleen S7).

Development
According to the developer Rockstar San Diego, the three cities present in the initial 2005 release of the game were chosen due to their significance to the game's automotive and racing themes. Atlanta was chosen for its pioneering of automobile customization, Detroit due to its status as the birthplace of the U.S. automobile industry, and San Diego for its influence on the development of street racing culture.

In February 2006, Rockstar Games announced that the Remix version was in development.

Midnight Club 3: Dub Edition Remix
Midnight Club 3: Dub Edition Remix is a revised edition of Midnight Club 3: Dub Edition. It is available as a Greatest Hits release on PlayStation 2 and a Platinum Hits release on Xbox (the remix edition of the game is not available for the PlayStation Portable). The game was released on March 12, 2006, or exactly eleven months after the original version's release. It was released on December 19, 2012 on PlayStation Network for the PS3, but was removed after a passing of time due to licensing issues.

The game features all of the cities, vehicles, music, and other features from Midnight Club 3: Dub Edition. This version of the game also allows the player to import the Midnight Club 3: Dub Edition data on their memory card to Midnight Club 3: Dub Edition Remix to make up for lost progress, thus saving the player from starting all over again.

The following features were added in Remix:
 24 new vehicles (including some from brands not in the original version, such as GMC, Infiniti, Pagani, and Scion)
 Tokyo, as a returning city, which is a slightly updated version of the Tokyo city from Midnight Club II. It serves as optional career mode, Tokyo Challenge
 25 new licensed songs
 Additional races and battle maps
 Recolored Menu UI, being recolored from a mostly blue/gold UI to a red/black/silver colored user interface

Soundtrack 
The following music can be found in Midnight Club 3: Dub Edition, the Remix soundtrack is also included. Musical artists found in the game include numerous Army of the Pharaohs members,  The Game, Paul Wall, T.I., 50 Cent, Big Tymers, Mannie Fresh, Fabolous, Bump J, Calyx,  Deep Blue, Ash, Aztec Mystic, Jimmy Eat World, Kasabian, Marilyn Manson, The Explosion, Nine Inch Nails, Sean Paul, Pitbull, Lil Wayne, and other artists. The soundtrack consisted of 99 tracks. The Remixs soundtrack consisted of 25 extra tracks; 124 tracks altogether. A large number of Detroit techno artists are also featured on the soundtrack, reflecting the game's setting.

Reception

The PlayStation 2 and Xbox versions of Midnight Club 3: Dub Edition received "favorable" reviews, while the PSP version received "average" reviews, according to the review aggregation website Metacritic.

The game has sold at least 1.1 million copies worldwide on the PS2 version, and 3.64 million copies worldwide on the PSP version. The PlayStation Portable release received a "Platinum" sales award from the Entertainment and Leisure Software Publishers Association (ELSPA), indicating sales of at least 300,000 copies in the United Kingdom.

Remix

The Dub Edition Remix received "favorable" reviews, more so than the original, according to Metacritic.

Notes

References

External links
 
 
 

Midnight Club games
2005 video games
Japan in non-Japanese culture
Open-world video games
PlayStation 2 games
PlayStation Network games
PlayStation Portable games
Rockstar Games games
Video games set in Detroit
Video games set in San Diego
Video games set in Atlanta
Video games set in Tokyo
Video games developed in the United Kingdom
Video games developed in the United States
Xbox games
Take-Two Interactive games
Street racing video games
Multiplayer and single-player video games